Mumra is a rural locality (a selo) and the administrative center of Mumrinsky Selsoviet in Ikryaninsky District, Astrakhan Oblast, Russia. The population was 2,372 as of 2010. There are 49 streets.

Geography 
Mumra is located 46 km south of Ikryanoye (the district's administrative centre) by road. Zyuzino is the nearest rural locality.

References 

Rural localities in Ikryaninsky District